Karl Menzies (born 17 June 1977) is a professional road bicycle racer riding for UCI Continental team . He finished second in the 2006 USA Cycling National Racing Calendar to Floyd Landis. Menzies turned professional in 2005, he spent one season on the Advantage Benefits/Endeavour team.

In 2006, he won the Nature Valley Grand Prix, ahead of teammate Greg Henderson. In 2005, he finished first overall at the International Cycling Classic. In 2007, he won stage 1 of the Jacob's Creek Tour Down Under and was the overall winner at the International Tour de Toona stage race.

Major results

2007
 2nd Overall Tour Down Under
1st Stage 2
2009
 7th National Road Race Championships
2011
1st Prologue Tour of Elk Grove
2013
5th USA Crits Finals, Las Vegas
2015
1st Dana Point Grand Prix
2nd Wilmington Grand Prix

References

External links
Profile on team website

1977 births
Australian male cyclists
Living people
Cyclists from Tasmania
People from Devonport, Tasmania